Sokovninka is a rural locality (a settlement at the passing loop) in Naumovsky Selsoviet Rural Settlement, Konyshyovsky District, Kursk Oblast, Russia. Population:

Geography 
The settlement is located 2 km from the source of the Chmacha River (a left tributary of the Svapa River), 60 km from the Russia–Ukraine border, 67 km north-west of Kursk, 10 km north-west of the district center – the urban-type settlement Konyshyovka, 7.5 km from the selsoviet center – Naumovka.

 Climate
Sokovninka has a warm-summer humid continental climate (Dfb in the Köppen climate classification).

Transport 
Sokovninka is located 54 km from the federal route  Ukraine Highway, 41 km from the route  Crimea Highway, 29.5 km from the route  (Trosna – M3 highway), 14.5 km from the road of regional importance  (Fatezh – Dmitriyev), 5 km from the road  (Konyshyovka – Zhigayevo – 38K-038), 19 km from the road  (Dmitriyev – Beryoza – Menshikovo – Khomutovka), on the road of intermunicipal significance  (Mashkino – railway station Sokovninka near the settlement of the same name – Naumovka). There is a railway station Sokovninka in the area of the settlement (railway line Navlya – Lgov-Kiyevsky).

The rural locality is situated 72 km from Kursk Vostochny Airport, 168 km from Belgorod International Airport and 272 km from Voronezh Peter the Great Airport.

References

Notes

Sources

Rural localities in Konyshyovsky District